Coptocycla elegans is a species of leaf beetles in the genus Coptocycla found in Brazil.

References

External links

Arthropods of Brazil
Beetles described in 1855
Cassidinae